Jack Stafford may refer to:
 Jack Stafford (umpire)
 Jack Stafford (rugby union)

See also
 John Stafford (disambiguation)